Francesco Cozza (born 19 January 1974) is an Italian football manager and former player, who played as a playmaker in the role of attacking midfielder.

Playing career
Born in Cariati, Calabria, Cozza started his career at A.C. Milan. He first signed for Reggiana in 1994, and in November left for Vicenza.

Cozza signed for Genoa C.F.C. at summer 2004, but left for A.C. Siena in January 2005. He returned to Reggina on loan for the 2005–06 season. Cozza returned to Siena in summer 2006, but left for Reggina again in summer 2007, in exchange with Alessandro Lucarelli.

Coaching career
On 29 June 2010, he signed a one-year contract with his former club Reggina, but as one of the coach assistant of youth team.

On 2 July 2011, it was confirmed Cozza had accepted an offer to become new head coach of Catanzaro in the Lega Pro Seconda Divisione (fourth division), he recently passed the coach exam.

After guiding Calabrian Serie D amateurs San Luca during the 2020–21 season, on 25 September 2021 Cozza was hired by Biancavilla, another Serie D club. He was fired by Biancavilla on 5 November 2021 after gaining 4 points in 7 games under his helm.

On 8 July 2022, Cozza agreed to return to guide San Luca for the 2022–23 Serie D season. He was sacked on 15 January 2023, just a mere few hours before the Serie D league game against Catania.

References

External links
lega-calcio.it
gazzetta.it

Living people
1974 births
Footballers from Calabria
Sportspeople from the Province of Cosenza
Association football midfielders
Italian footballers
Italy under-21 international footballers
A.C. Milan players
A.C. Reggiana 1919 players
L.R. Vicenza players
S.S.D. Lucchese 1905 players
Cagliari Calcio players
U.S. Lecce players
Reggina 1914 players
Genoa C.F.C. players
A.C.N. Siena 1904 players
Serie A players
Serie B players
Italian football managers
U.S. Catanzaro 1929 managers
Serie C managers
Serie D managers